Robert John Maudsley (born 26 June 1953) is an English man convicted of multiple murders. Maudsley killed four people, with one of the killings taking place in a psychiatric hospital and two in prison after receiving a life sentence for a murder. Initial reports falsely stated he ate part of the brain of one of the men he killed in prison, which earned him the nickname Hannibal the Cannibal among the British press and "The Brain Eater" amongst other prisoners. However, the Press Complaints Commission records that national newspapers were subsequently advised that the allegations were untrue, according to the autopsy report. Maudsley is the longest-serving British prisoner in solitary confinement.

Early life
Robert Maudsley was one of 12 children, born in Speke, Liverpool, spending his early years in a Catholic orphanage in Crosby. At the age of eight, Maudsley was retrieved by his parents and subjected to routine physical abuse until he was eventually removed from their care by social services. Maudsley later stated that he was raped as a child by his father, and such early abuse had left deep psychological scars.

As a teenager during the late 1960s, Maudsley was a sex worker in London, using his income to support his drug addiction. He was forced to seek psychiatric help after several suicide attempts. It was during his talk with doctors that he claimed to hear voices telling him to kill his parents. He is quoted as saying "If I had killed my parents in 1970, none of these people would have died."

Murders
In 1974, Maudsley garrotted John Farrell in Wood Green, London. Farrell picked up Maudsley for sex and allegedly showed him pictures of children he had sexually abused. Maudsley surrendered himself to police, saying he needed psychiatric care. Maudsley was found unfit to stand trial and instead was sent to Broadmoor Hospital. 

In 1977, he and another resident, David Cheeseman, who at the time was serving a prison sentence for rape and sexual assault of a sixteen-year-old girl, locked themselves in a cell with a third patient named David Francis, a convicted child molester. The attack was claimed to be in revenge for a "homosexual attack" on one of the friends of the two men. They tortured him to death over a period of nine hours. After this incident, Maudsley was convicted of manslaughter and sent to Wakefield Prison. He disliked the transfer and made it clear he wanted to return to Broadmoor. Maudsley was later sentenced to life imprisonment with a recommendation that he never be released.

In 1978, Maudsley killed two fellow prisoners at Wakefield Prison in one day; he had originally set out to kill seven. His first victim was Salney Darwood, imprisoned for killing his wife. At the time Darwood had been giving Maudsley French lessons. Maudsley had invited Darwood to his cell, where he garrotted and stabbed him before hiding his body under his bed. He then attempted to lure other prisoners into his cell, but all refused. Maudsley then prowled the wing hunting for a second victim, eventually cornering and stabbing prisoner William Roberts to death as he was lying in his bed. He hacked at Roberts' skull with a makeshift dagger and then struck his head against the wall multiple times. Maudsley calmly walked into the wing office, placed the dagger on the table and told the officer that the next roll call would be two short.

Maudsley states his victims were rapists, paedophiles or sex offenders and that he is only a threat to sex offenders.

Victims
 John Farrell, age 30, on 14 March 1974.
 David Francis, age 26, on 26 February 1977. Francis was a convicted child molester, sentenced to Broadmoor.
 Salney Darwood, age 46, on 29 July 1978. Darwood was imprisoned for sexual-assault and the killing of his wife.
 William Roberts, age 56, on 29 July 1978.

Solitary confinement

In 1983, Maudsley was deemed too dangerous for a normal cell. Prison authorities built a two-cell unit in the basement of Wakefield Prison. Due to his history of violence, when outside his cell he is escorted by at least four prison officers.

In March 2000, Maudsley unsuccessfully pleaded for the terms of his solitary confinement be relaxed, or to be allowed to take his own life via a cyanide capsule. He also asked for a pet budgerigar, which was also denied.

See also
 List of serial killers in the United Kingdom
 List of serial killers by number of victims

References

1953 births
1973 murders in the United Kingdom
1977 murders in the United Kingdom
1978 murders in the United Kingdom
20th-century English criminals
Criminals from Merseyside
Crime in Berkshire
Crime in West Yorkshire
English people convicted of manslaughter
English people convicted of murder
English prisoners sentenced to life imprisonment
English serial killers
Living people
Male serial killers
People acquitted by reason of insanity
People convicted of murder by England and Wales
People detained at Broadmoor Hospital
People from Speke
Prisoners sentenced to life imprisonment by England and Wales
Vigilantes
Violence against men in the United Kingdom